Samantha Scaffidi is an American actress. She began her career in short films before becoming known for her role as Victoria Heyes in Terrifier (2016) and Terrifier 2 (2022), and Luce in Demon Hole (2017)—all three slasher films. In addition to acting, Scaffidi is known for directing the RAINN public service announcement Wait.

Career

Independent films
Scaffidi began her career with a minor role as a waitress in the short film Uncomfortable Silence and Bea in Derailing (both in 2013). In 2015, she portrayed Georgette in the feature film Sam and Samantha in the short film Act, Naturally. The same year, Scaffidi had a supporting role as Michelle in the independent comedy film The Networker. The following year, she portrayed the lead character Luce in the comedy horror film Demon Hole which premiered at the Cannes Film Festival and was picked up by SC Films and SP Releasing. In 2018, Scaffidi had a supporting role as Alessandria in the feature length film Sarah Q.

Terrifier franchise
Scaffidi read the script for a film titled Terrifier written by the director Damien Leone and was initially reluctant to sign on to the project due to finding it "grotesque" and "horrifying"—but joined after a meeting with Leone. Scaffidi had to choose between the parts of Dawn and Victoria, choosing the latter as she related to the character more. Filming began in 2016, and Scaffidi describes filming it as a fun experience because she got to see how everything got put together and found Art the Clown actor David Howard Thornton to be very friendly on the set. During filming, Leone made it known to her that he intended to bring her back as Victoria in the follow-up film, Terrifier 2 (2022). She describes filming the sequel as a more enjoyable experience due to becoming familiar with the production crew (most of which were a part of the first film) and a better understanding of Victoria. Due to the Victoria character's disfigurement, Scaffidi had to wear extensive prosthetic makeup throughout filming parts 1 and 2. Terrifier went viral following its Netflix debut and has attracted a cult following, becoming Scaffidi's first role and project to obtain a growing fandom.

Personal life
Scaffidi is primarily a Manhattan based actress. She has a Bachelor's Degree in Business Administration from Salve Regina University and a Certificate in Acting from the William Esper Studio.

Filmography

Film

References

Living people
21st-century American actresses
American film actresses
Year of birth missing (living people)